Son de Mar is the fifth album by Piano Magic, released on 6 August 2001. It is the soundtrack to the film of the same name (translated into English as Sound of the Sea), directed by Bigas Luna. The album was also the band's first release on 4AD. It was reissued on vinyl for the first time by Public House Recordings in May 2016.

Track listing

References

2002 albums
Piano Magic albums
4AD albums